Paula Andrea Pérez García (born 10 January 1996) is a Colombian former professional tennis player.

Pérez won four doubles titles on the ITF Women's Circuit. On 6 October 2014, she reached her best singles ranking of world No. 941. On 3 November 2014, she peaked at No. 583 in the WTA doubles rankings.

Pérez made her WTA Tour debut at the 2013 Copa Colsanitas, partnering her sister María Paulina in doubles. The twins lost their first-round match against Alizé Cornet and Pauline Parmentier.

Playing for Colombia Fed Cup team, Pérez has a win–loss record of 1–0.

ITF finals

Doubles: 11 (4 titles, 7 runner–ups)

Fed Cup participation

Doubles

References

External links
 
 
 

1996 births
Living people
Sportspeople from Barranquilla
Colombian female tennis players
Twin sportspeople
Colombian twins
20th-century Colombian women
21st-century Colombian women